Communist Marxist Party (Aravindakshan) is one of the two splinter factions of CMP, which was led by K.R. Aravindakshan at the time of founding. In 2019, the party merged with CPI(M). Now a faction of CMP(A) is led by M. V. Rajesh and continue supporting the Left Democratic Front.

Main leaders
K.R. Aravindakshan
M. K. Kannan

References

Defunct political parties in Kerala
2014 establishments in Kerala
Communist parties in India
Political parties established in 2014
2019 disestablishments in India
Political parties disestablished in 2019